Arturia adusta is a species of sea sponge in the family Clathrinidae found in Australia. The species was first described as Clathrina adusta  by Gert Wörheide &  John Hooper in 1999,  and was assigned to the genus, Arthuria, in 2016 by Oliver Voigt & Wörheide. However, the name Arthuria had already been used  (for a mollusc) and hence the genus name was changed to Arturia.

References

Ernstia
Sponges of Australia
Animals described in 1999
Taxa named by John Hooper (marine biologist)
Taxa named by Gert Wörheide